The Cavan Junior Football Championship is an annual Gaelic Athletic Association club competition between the third-tier Cavan Gaelic football clubs. It was first competed for in 1913. The winner qualifies to represent their county in the Ulster Club Championship and in turn, go on to the All-Ireland Junior Club Football Championship. The current champions are Kill, who defeated Arva in the 2013 decider on a scoreline of 1-14 to 1-13.

Format
10 teams will contest the Hotel Kilmore Junior Championship in 2014.

Teams have been drawn into 3 groups, one consisting 4 teams (Group 1) and two consisting 3 teams (Group 2 & 3). The group stages will be played on a league basis. Where teams finish on equal points group placings will be decided in accordance with rule 6.20 of the GAA Official Guide 2013.

The top team in each group will qualify for the semi-finals. The runner up in group 2 and 3 will play off, with the winner qualifying to play in a further playoff against the runner up in group 1. The winner of this play off will qualify for the semi-final.

Semi-final pairings will be based on an open draw.

Group A

Group B

Group C

Semi Final play-offs

Semi-final

Final

References

External links
 Cavan at ClubGAA
 Official Cavan GAA Website

Cavan Junior Football Championship
Cavan GAA Football championships